Yongfu Power Station, also known as Guodian Yongfu Power Plant or  Yongfu Power Plant, is a Chinese thermal power plant located at Yongfu County. The power plant belongs to China Energy Investment Corporation.

History
Construction of Yongfu Power Station began in July 1998. In the first phase of the plant, two 125,000-kilowatt modified ultra-high pressure units were completed and put into operation in 2000.  

The 2×300MW sub-critical coal-fired units in the second phase of the project were put into operation in 2007.  

In 2008, the project of using high-efficiency and low-consumption large units and shutting down high-consumption and low-efficiency small units in Yongfu Power Plant was formally approved by the National Development and Reform Commission, with a total investment of 2.69 billion yuan.

In November 2013, China Guodian Corporation and Électricité de France jointly built the third phase of Yongfu Power Station, with a total investment of approximately 2.8 billion yuan.

References 

Coal-fired power stations in China
2000 establishments in China
Energy infrastructure completed in 2000